The 2020 Montana Republican presidential primary took place on June 2, 2020, as one of 7 contests scheduled for that day in the Republican Party primaries for the 2020 presidential election.

Results

See also
 2020 Montana Democratic presidential primary

References

Republican primary
Montana
June 2020 events in the United States
Montana Republican primaries